Mark Petrovskii is a Russian boxer. He competed at the 2021 AIBA World Boxing Championships, winning the gold medal in the super heavyweight division.

References

External links 

Living people
Place of birth missing (living people)
Russian male boxers
Super-heavyweight boxers
AIBA World Boxing Championships medalists
1999 births